Valerian "Valiko" Shalikashvili (1874–1919) was a Georgian producer, actor, and playwright. He played on the Russian Theatre stage and charmed his audiences.

References
მებუკე დ., ვალერიან შალიკაშვილი, თბ., 1956;
ცაგარეიშვილი ლ., ქსე, ტ. 10, გვ. 678, თბ., 1986

Male stage actors from Georgia (country)
Dramatists and playwrights from Georgia (country)
1874 births
1919 deaths
20th-century dramatists and playwrights from Georgia (country)
19th-century dramatists and playwrights from Georgia (country)
Male actors from the Russian Empire
Dramatists and playwrights from the Russian Empire